The following is a list of films shot wholly or partly in Brisbane, Australia.

Films

See also
 Australian Film Commission
 Cinema of Australia
 Film Australia
 Screen Australia
 South Australian Film Corporation
 World cinema
 List of Australian films
 List of films set in Australia
 List of films shot in Adelaide
 List of films shot in Darwin
 List of films shot on the Gold Coast
 List of films shot in Queensland
 List of films shot in Sydney
 List of films shot in Tasmania
 List of films shot in Western Australia

References

Films
Brisbane